Kalle Heikki Vuorinen (30 December 1851, in Urjala – 26 May 1929) was a Finnish farmer and politician. He was a Member of the Parliament of Finland from 1912 to 1913.

References

1851 births
1929 deaths
People from Urjala
People from Häme Province (Grand Duchy of Finland)
Finnish Party politicians
Members of the Parliament of Finland (1911–13)